Joel Joseph Chianese (born 15 February 1990) is an Australian professional footballer who plays as an attacking midfielder or forward for Indian Super League club Hyderabad.

Career

Sydney FC
Chianese made his senior debut in the first game of the 2011 Asian Champions League as a substitute for Hirofumi Moriyasu in the 0–3 loss against Kashima Antlers at the Sydney Football Stadium.

His A-League debut for the club didn't arrive until Round 19 of the 2011–12 A-League season, coming on as a substitute in the 5–2 thrashing at the hands of Newcastle Jets at the Sydney Football Stadium.
Chianese scored twice in the first final of the 2011/12 season against the Wellington Phoenix FC, however it was not enough as Sydney lost 3–2.

National Premier Leagues
Following his release from Sydney FC, Chianese signed with National Premier Leagues NSW club Sydney United, and undertook a 2-week trial in England with Football League One club Swindon Town. This trial proved unsuccessful despite scoring twice in a friendly against Cheltenham Town, and he returned to Australia.

Chianese left Sydney United at the conclusion of the 2014 National Premier Leagues NSW season and signed with crosstown rivals Bonnyrigg White Eagles for 2015, for whom he scored a brace on debut.

Malaysia

In March 2015 it was reported that Chianese had traveled to New Zealand to play for Auckland City FC in the 2014–15 OFC Champions League, however Auckland failed to register him in time for the competition. However, in a bizarre twist of fate, Auckland City then sold him on to Malaysia Premier League club Sabah FA for the remainder of the 2015 Malaysia Premier League after they had released Singaporean Fazrul Nawaz for disciplinary reasons.

In December 2015 it was announced that Chianese had decided to join Negeri Sembilan FA, linking up with former National Soccer League winning coach Gary Phillips, and a host of former A-League players for the 2016 Malaysia Premier League season

Despite scoring 10 goals in 15 league appearances, Chianese was released from his contract mid-season with Negeri Sembilan FA along with fellow Australian Andrew Nabbout.

Perth Glory
At the end of August 2016, Chianese returned to the A-League, joining Perth Glory.

Hyderabad FC
At the end of August 2020, Chianese joined Indian Super League club Hyderabad FC.

Return to Perth Glory 
On 12 April 2021, Chianese returned to the A-League once again, agreeing a short-term deal with former club Perth Glory until the end of the 2020–21 season, while also signing a year extension with Hyderabad FC.

Career statistics

Honours
Perth Glory
 A-League Premiership: 2018–19
Hyderabad FC
Indian Super League: 2021–22

References

External links
 Sydney FC youth profile
 
 FootballMalaysia Profile

1990 births
Australian soccer players
Australian people of Italian descent
Living people
Blacktown City FC players
Sydney FC players
Sydney United 58 FC players
Bonnyrigg White Eagles FC players
Auckland City FC players
Sabah F.C. (Malaysia) players
Negeri Sembilan FA players
Perth Glory FC players
Association football forwards
Hyderabad FC players